Fedor Likholitov (born March 14, 1980) is a Russian former professional basketball player. He is a power forward – center who most recently played for Krasny Oktyabr in VTB United League.

College career
After playing youth club basketball with Baltika St. Petersburg, in Russia, Likholitov played college basketball at Virginia Commonwealth University, with the VCU Rams, from 1998 to 2002.

Professional career
In late April 2002, Likholitov moved to France to play professionally, and he was signed by SIG Strasbourg. He moved to Greece for the 2002–03 season, and was signed by Aris Thessaloniki. He played there also the 2003–04 championship. He moved to Russia for the 2004–05 season, where he signed with Dynamo Moscow and played there also the 2005–06 championship. He was signed for the 2006–07 season by Dynamo Moscow Region, and he played there also the 2007–08 season though the team has changed its name to Triumph Lyubertsy. Likholitov signed for the 2008–09 season with Ural Great Perm, and signed for the 2009–10 season by UNICS Kazan. In December 2009, he moved to Turkey and signed with Beşiktaş. In July 2011, he returned to Russia and signed with Krasnye Krylia. He later also played with Avtodor Saratov and Krasny Oktyabr, before finishing his pro career in 2015.

National team career
Likholitov was also a member of the senior Russian national basketball team. With Russia, he played at the 2003 EuroBasket and the 2005 EuroBasket.

References

External links 
EuroCup Profile
FIBA Profile

1980 births
Living people
Aris B.C. players
BC Avtodor Saratov players
BC Dynamo Moscow players
BC Krasny Oktyabr players
BC Krasnye Krylia players
BC UNICS players
BC Zenit Saint Petersburg players
Beşiktaş men's basketball players
Centers (basketball)
PBC Ural Great players
Russian men's basketball players
Russian expatriate sportspeople  in France
Russian expatriate basketball people in the United States
Russian expatriate basketball people in Turkey
SIG Basket players
Basketball players from Saint Petersburg
VCU Rams men's basketball players